Jenna Joan Laguana Merrill (born 20 February 1992) is an American-born Guamanian footballer who plays as a midfielder. She has been a member of the Guam women's national team.

Early life
Merrill was raised in Scottsdale, Arizona.

International goals
Scores and results list Guam's goal tally first

References

1992 births
Living people
Women's association football midfielders
Guamanian women's footballers
Guam women's international footballers
American women's soccer players
Soccer players from Scottsdale, Arizona
UT Martin Skyhawks women's soccer players
Bethel Wildcats women's soccer players